This is a list of books by Australian author Jackie French (born 1953).

Bibliography in order of publication (not including overseas editions)

1980s

1986
 Organic Gardening in Australia

1988
 Natural Rose Growing: An Organic Approach to Gardening
 The Organic Garden Doctor
 Smudge

1990s

1990
 Natural Control of Household Pests

1991
 Rain Stones
 The Roo that Won the Melbourne Cup

1992
 The Boy who Had Wings
 The Music from the Sea, Children of the Valley series

1993
 The Wilderness Garden: A Radical New View of Australian Growing Methods
 The Salad Garden
 Organic Control of Household Pests
 Organic Control of Common Weeds
 The Earth Gardeners Companion: A Month-by-Month Guide
 The Chook Book
 A to Z of Useful Plants
 The City in the Sand, Children of the Valley series
 The House of a Hundred Animals, Children of the Valley series
 Walking the Boundaries
 Hairy Charlie and the Frog (with Dee Huxley)

1994
 Twelve Bottles Popping: Home-Made Presents to Flip Your Lid
 Hairy Charlie and the Frog
 Hairy Charlie and the Pumpkin
 The Metal Men, Children of the Valley series
 Somewhere Around the Corner
 New Plants from Old
 Book of Lavender
 Book of Mint
 Book of Rosemary
 Book of Thyme
 Book of Chilli
 Book of Garlic
 Book of Parsley
 Book of Basil
 Jackie French's Guide to Companion Planting in Australia and New Zealand
 Switch! A Book of Home-Made Power, Water, and Garbage Systems
 Household Self Sufficiency

1995
 Mermaids
 Alien Games
 Annie's Pouch
 The Secret Beach
 Back Yard Self Sufficiency
 The Organic Garden Problem Solver
 Plants That Never Say Die
 Soil Food: 3,764 Ways to Feed Your Garden
 Jackie French's Top Ten Vegetables
 Jackie French's Cook Book

1996
 Mind's Eye
 The Tribe that Sang to Trees, Children of the Valley series
 A Wombat Named Bosco
 Beyond the Boundaries
 The Warrior: The Story of a Wombat
 The Pumpkin Book
 Yates Guide to Edible Gardening
 Growing Flowers Naturally

1997
 Dancing with Ben Hall and Other Yarns
 The Silver Eyes
 The Book of Unicorns
 Soldier on the Hill
 Making Money from Your Garden
 Summerland

1998
 A Phaery Named Phredde and Other Stories to Eat with a Banana, Phredde the Phaery series
 Daughter of the Regiment
 Felix Smith has Every Right to Be a Crocodile
 There's an Echidna at the Bottom of My Garden
 The Little Book of Big Questions
 How the Aliens from Alpha Centauri Invaded My Maths Class and Turned Me Into a Writer
 Seasons of Content
 Yates Guide to Herbs
 Jackie French's Household Herb Book
 The Little Book of Big Questions

1999
 Phredde and a Frog Named Bruce and Other Stories to Eat with a Watermelon, Phredde the Phaery series
 There's a Wallaby at the Bottom of My Garden
 Charlie's Gold
 Tajore Arkle
 Hitler's Daughter
 How to Guzzle Your Garden
 Natural Solutions
 Tajore Arkle
 The Small Book of Big Questions (UK edition)

2000s

2000
 Lady Dance
 Burt and the Band
 Captain Purrfect
 Pigs Don't Fly
 Stamp, Stomp, Whomp
 The Book of Challenges
 Phredde and the Zombie Librarian and Other Stories to Eat with a Blood Plum, Phredde the Phaery series
 Missing You, Love Sara
 The Best of Jackie French: A Practical Guide to Everything from Aphids to Zucchini Chocolate Cake

2001
 The Secret Life of Santa Claus
 How the Finnegans Saved the Ship
 Phredde and the Temple of Gloom - A Story to Eat with a Mandarin, Phredde the Phaery series
 The Fascinating History of Your Lunch
 Dark Wind Blowing
 In the Blood, Outlands trilogy
 The House that Jackie Built
 The Café on Callisto, Café on Callisto series
 Earthly Delights

2002
 Ride the Wild Wind
 Phredde and the Leopard-Skin Librarian - A Story to Eat with a Dinosaur Apple, Phredde the Phaery series
 The White Ship
 The Space Bug
 Space Pirates on Callisto, Café on Callisto series
 Diary of a Wombat, Shaggy Gully books
 Blood Moon, Outlands trilogy

2003
 Too Many Pears!
 Bears Don't Bounce!
 My Mum the Pirate, Wacky Families series
 My Dog the Dinosaur, Wacky Families series
 Phredde and the Purple Pyramid - A Story to Eat with a Passionfruit, Phredde the Phaery series
 A Box Full of Phaeries, Phreddes and Fruit, Phredde the Phaery series
 Valley of Gold
 The Black House
 A War for Gentlemen
 Searching for Charlie
 Vampire Slugs on Callisto, Café on Callisto series
 Big Burps, Bare Bums and Other Bad-Mannered Blunders

2004
 Pete the Sheep, Shaggy Gully books
 Phredde and the Vampire Footie Team - A Story to Eat with an Orange at Half Time, Phredde the Phaery series
 My Dad the Dragon, Wacky Families series
 My Uncle Gus the Garden Gnome, Wacky Families series
 Tom Appleby, Convict Boy
 Rocket Your Child into Reading
 Flesh and Blood, Outlands trilogy
 To the Moon and Back

2005
 Phredde and the Ghostly Underpants - A Story to Eat with a Mango, Phredde the Phaery series
 Phredde and the Runaway Ghost Train, Phredde the Phaery series
 The Secret World of Wombats
 My Uncle Wal the Werewolf, Wacky Families series
 They Came on Viking Ships
 Grim Crims & Convicts: 1788-1820, Fair Dinkum Histories
 How to Scratch a Wombat

2006
 Josephine Wants to Dance, Shaggy Gully books
 My Gran the Gorilla, Wacky Families series
 My Auntie Chook the Vampire Chicken, Wacky Families series
 Macbeth and Son
 One Perfect Day
 The Goat who Sailed the World, Animal Heroes series
 Shipwreck, Sailors & 60,000 Years: Before 1788, Fair Dinkum Histories

2007
 The Shaggy Gully Times, Shaggy Gully books
 My Pa the Polar Bear, Wacky Families series
 Pharaoh
 New Plants from Old: Simple, Natural, No-Cost Plant Propagation
 The Wilderness Garden: Beyond Organic Gardening
 The Day I Was History
 The Dog who Loved a Queen, Animal Heroes series
 Rotters and Squatters: 1820-1850, Fair Dinkum Histories
 Gold, Graves and Glory: 1850-1880, Fair Dinkum Histories
 Pharaoh

2008
 Emily and the Big Bad Bunyip, Shaggy Gully books
 One Big Wacky Family, Wacky Families series
 The Wonderful World of Wallabies and Kangaroos
 How High Can a Kangaroo Hop?
 A Rose for the Anzac Boys
 The Camel who Crossed Australia, Animal Heroes series
 A Nation of Swaggies & Diggers: 1880-1920, Fair Dinkum Histories

2009
 The Night They Stormed Eureka
 Baby Wombat's Week, Shaggy Gully books
 The Donkey who Carried the Wounded, Animal Heroes series
 Lessons for a Werewolf Warrior, School for Heroes series
 Wonderfully Wacky Families, Wacky Families series
 The Wombat and the Great Poohjam
 Weevils, War & Wallabies: 1920-1945, Fair Dinkum Histories
 Backyard Self Sufficienty

2010s

2010
 A Waltz for Matilda
 Queen Victoria's Underpants
 Oracle
 Dance of the Deadly Dinosaurs, School for Heroes series
 The Horse who Bit a Bushranger, Animal Heroes series
 Rockin', Rollin, Hair & Hippies: 1945-1972, Fair Dinkum Histories
 A Year in the Valley

2011
 Booms, Busts and Bushfires: 1972—, Fair Dinkum Histories
 The Tomorrow Book
 Christmas Wombat, Shaggy Gully books
 Nanberry: Black Brother White
 Flood

2012
 A Day to Remember
 Elephant Alert
 Gorilla Grab
 Tiger Tangle
 Shark Attack
 Pennies for Hitler
 Dingo: The Dog who Conquered a Continent
 The Girl from Snowy River
 Queen Victoria's Christmas

2013
 The Road to Gundagai
 Let the Land Speak
 Dinosaurs Love Cheese
 Wombat Goes to School
 
 Nanberry: Black Brother White
 Hitler’s Daughter: the play  [with Tim McGary, Eva De Cesare and Sandie Eldridge]

2014
 I am Juliet
 Good Dog Hank!
 The Book of Horses & Unicorns
 The Hairy-nosed Wombats Find a New Home
 To Love a Sunburnt Country
 I Spy a Great Reader
 The Beach They Called Gallipoli

2015
 Birrung The Secret Friend (Secret Histories : Book 1)
 The Hairy Nosed Wombats Find A New Home, illustrated by Sue deGennaro
 Good Dog Hank, illustrated by Nina Rycroft
 Ophelia: Queen of Denmark
 Fire, illustrated by Bruce Whatley
 Horace the Baker's Horse, illustrated by Peter Bray
 The Ghost by the Billabong (The Matilda Saga : Book 5)

2016
 Barney and the Secret of the Whales (Secret Histories : Book 2)
 Dinosaurs Love Cheese, illustrated by Nina Rycroft
 The Beach They Called Gallipoli, illustrated by Bruce Whatley
 Grandma Wombat, illustrated by Bruce Whatley
 Josephine Wants To Dance (10th Anniversary Edition), illustrated by Bruce Whatley
 Diary of a Wombat Big Book (Giant Picture Storybooks), illustrated by Bruce Whatley
 Baby Wombat's Week Big Book (Giant Picture Storybooks), illustrated by Bruce Whatley
 The Diary of William Shakespeare, Gentleman
 Rain Stones 25th Anniversary Edition
 If Blood Should Stain the Wattle (The Matilda Saga)

2017
 The Secret of the Black Bushranger (The Secret History Series)
 Miss Lily's Lovely Ladies (Miss Lily series #1)
 Millie Loves Ants, illustrated by Sue deGennaro
 Goodbye Mr Hitler
 Third Witch
 Wombat Wins, illustrated by Bruce Whatley
 If Blood Should Stain the Wattle (The Matilda Saga)
 Wombat Goes to School, illustrated by Bruce Whatley
 Koala Bare, illustrated by Matt Shanks
 Facing the Flame (The Matilda Saga: Book 7)
 With Love from Miss Lily (A Christmas Story) ebook

2018
 Barney and the Secret of the French Spies (The Secret History Series)
 Cyclone, illustrated by Bruce Whatley
 Shipwreck, Sailors & 60,000 Years (Fair Dinkum Histories Series: Book 1), illustrated by Peter Sheehan
 Grim Crims & Convicts (Fair Dinkum Histories #2), illustrated by Peter Sheehan
 The Lily and the Rose (Miss Lily series #2)
 Drought, illustrated by Bruce Whatley
 Rotters and Squatters (Fair Dinkum Histories #3), illustrated by Peter Sheehan
 Gold, Graves and Glory(Fair Dinkum Histories #4), illustrated by Peter Sheehan
 Christmas Lilies (A Christmas Story) ebook

2019 

 The Lily in the Snow (Miss Lily series #3)
 Pirate Boy of Sydney Town

2020 

 Lilies, Lies and Love (Miss Lily series #4)

Picture books
 Diary of a Wombat (2002)
 Pete the Sheep (2004), published as Pete the Sheep-Sheep in the US
 The Secret World of Wombats (2005), published as How to Scratch a Wombat in the USA
 Josephine Wants to Dance (2006), published as Josephine Loves to Dance in the US
 The Shaggy Gully Times (2007)
 Emily and the Big Bad Bunyip (2008)
 Baby Wombat's Week (2009)
 Queen Victoria's Underpants (2010)
 Christmas Wombat (2011)
 The Tomorrow Book (2011) (with Sue Degennaro)
 Queen Victoria's Underpants 
 Queen Victoria's Christmas (2012)
 Dinosaurs Love Cheese (2013) (with Nina Ryecroft)
 Wombat Goes to School (2013)
 Good Dog Hank! (2014) (with Sue Degennaro)
 The hairy nosed wombats find a new home (with Sue Degennaro)
 Flood
 Fire 
 The beach they called Gallipoli 
  A Day to Remember (with Mark Wilson)
 Two Many Pears! (with Bruce Whatle) 
 Hairy Charlie and the Frog (1994), illustrated by Dee Huxley
 Hairy Charlie and the Pumpkin (1994), illustrated by Dee Huxley
 Mermaids (1995)
 Pigs Don't Fly (2000)
 Too Many Pears! (originally titled Pear-Pinching Pamela) (2003), illustrated by Bruce Whatley
 Bears Don't Bounce! (2003)
 Queen Victoria's Underpants (2010)
 The Tomorrow Book (2011)
 Flood (2011)
 A Day to Remember (2012)
 The Fire Wombat (2020), illustrated by Danny Snell

Junior fiction

Short story collections
 Rain Stones (1991)
 Alien Games (1995)
 Mind's Eye (1996)
 Dancing with Ben Hall and Other Yarns (1997), illustrated by Gwen Harrison
 The Silver Eyes (1997), illustrated by David Miller
 The Book of Unicorns (1997)
 Ride the Wild Wind (2002)

Animal Rescue series
 Elephant Alert (2012)
 Gorilla Grab (2012)
 Tiger Tangle (2012)
 Shark Attack (2012)

Café on Callisto series
illustrated by Sarah Baron

 The Café on Callisto (2001)
 Space Pirates on Callisto (2002)
 Vampire Slugs on Callisto (2003)

The Children of the Valley series
illustrated by Victoria Clutterbuck

 The Music from the Sea (1992)
 The City in the Sand (1993)
 The House of a Hundred Animals (1993)
 The Metal Men (1994)
 The Tribe that Sang to Trees (1996)

Phredde the Phaery series
illustrated by Stephen Michael King

 A Phaery Named Phredde and Other Stories to Eat with a Banana (1998)
 Phredde and a Frog Named Bruce and Other Stories to Eat with a Watermelon (1999)
 Phredde and the Zombie Librarian and Other Stories to Eat with a Blood Plum (2000)
 Phredde and the Temple of Gloom - A Story to Eat with a Mandarin (2001)
 Phredde and the Leopard-Skin Librarian - A Story to Eat with a Dinosaur Apple (2002)
 Phredde and the Purple Pyramid - A Story to Eat with a Passionfruit (2003)
 Phredde and the Vampire Footie Team - A Story to Eat with an Orange at Half Time (2004)
 Phredde and the Ghostly Underpants - A Story to Eat with a Mango (2005)
 Phredde and the Runaway Ghost Train (2005)

 A Box Full of Phaeries, Phreddes and Fruit (compilation of the first three books in the series) (2003)

School for Heroes series
illustrated by Andrea F. Potter

 Lessons for a Werewolf Warrior (2009)
 Dance of the Deadly Dinosaurs (2010)

Wacky Families series
illustrated by Stephen Michael King

 My Mum the Pirate (2003), published as My Mom the Pirate in the US
 My Dog the Dinosaur (2003)
 My Dad the Dragon (2004)
 My Uncle Gus the Garden Gnome (2004)
 My Uncle Wal the Werewolf (2005)
 My Gran the Gorilla (2006)
 My Auntie Chook the Vampire Chicken (2006)
 My Pa the Polar Bear (2007)
 One Big Wacky Family (2008) (compilation of the first to fourth books in the series)
 Wonderfully Wacky Families (2009) (compilation of the fourth to eighth books in the series)

Historical fiction

Animal Heroes series
 The Goat who Sailed the World (2006)
 The Dog who Loved a Queen (2007)
 The Camel who Crossed Australia (2008)
 The Donkey who Carried the Wounded (2009)
 The Horse who Bit a Bushranger (2010)
 Dingo: The Dog who Conquered a Continent (2012)

Miscellaneous
 Somewhere Around the Corner (1994)
 Soldier on the Hill (1997)
 Daughter of the Regiment (1998)
 Hitler's Daughter (1999)
 Lady Dance (2000)
 How the Finnegans Saved the Ship (2001)
 The White Ship (2002)
 Valley of Gold (2003)
 Tom Appleby, Convict Boy (2004)
 They Came on Viking Ships (2005), published as Slave Girl in the UK and Rover in the US
 Macbeth and Son (2006)
 Pharaoh (2007)
 The Night They Stormed Eureka (2009)
 Oracle (2010)
 Nanberry: Black Brother White (2011)
 Pennies for Hitler (June 2012) (companion volume to Hitler's Daughter)

Miscellaneous
 The Roo that Won the Melbourne Cup (1991), illustrated by Carol McLean-Carr
 The Boy who Had Wings (1992)
 Walking the Boundaries (1993)
 Annie's Pouch (1995), illustrated by Bettina Guthridge
 The Secret Beach (1995)
 A Wombat Named Bosco (1996), illustrated by Bettina Guthridge
 Beyond the Boundaries (1996) (sequel to Walking the Boundaries)
 The Warrior: The Story of a Wombat (1996), illustrated by Bettina Guthridge
 Summerland (1997)
 Felix Smith Has Every Right to Be a Crocodile (1998), illustrated by David Stanley
 There's an Echidna at the Bottom of My Garden (1998), illustrated by Bettina Guthridge
 There's a Wallaby at the Bottom of My Garden (1999), illustrated by David Stanley
 Charlie's Gold (1999)
 Tajore Arkle (1999)
 Burt and the Band (2000), illustrated by Beth Norling
 Captain Purrfect (2000), illustrated by Gus Gordon
 The Space Bug (2002), illustrated by Mitch Vane
 The Black House (2003)
 One Perfect Day (2006), illustrated by Peter Bray
 The Day I Was History (2007), illustrated by Christina Booth
 The Wombat and the Great Poohjam (2009)

Junior non-fiction

Fair Dinkum Histories
illustrated by Peter Sheehan

Shipwreck, Sailors & 60,000 Years: Before 1788 (2006)
Grim Crims & Convicts: 1788-1820 (2005)
Rotters and Squatters: 1820-1850 (2007)
Gold, Graves and Glory: 1850-1880 (2007)
A Nation of Swaggies & Diggers: 1880-1920 (2008)
Weevils, War & Wallabies: 1920-1945 (2009)
Rockin', Rollin, Hair & Hippies: 1945-1972 (2010)
Booms, Busts and Bushfires: 1972— (2011)

Miscellaneous
 Twelve Bottles Popping: Home-Made Presents to Flip Your Lid (1994)
 The Little Book of Big Questions (1998), illustrated by Terry Denton
 How the Aliens from Alpha Centauri Invaded My Maths Class and Turned Me Into a Writer (1998)
 How to Guzzle Your Garden (1999)
 Stamp, Stomp, Whomp (2000)
 The Book of Challenges (2000)
 The Fascinating History of Your Lunch (2001)
 Big Burps, Bare Bums and Other Bad-Mannered Blunders (2003)
 To the Moon and Back (2004), written with Bryan Sullivan and illustrated by Gus Gordon
 How to Scratch a Wombat (2005)
 The Wonderful World of Wallabies and Kangaroos (2008)
 How High Can a Kangaroo Hop? (2008), illustrated by Bruce Whatley

Teen and young adult fiction

Outlands trilogy
 In the Blood (2001)
 Blood Moon (2002)
 Flesh and Blood (also known as Blood Will Tell) (2004)

Historical fiction
 A Rose for the Anzac Boys (2008)

The Matilda Series 
A Waltz for Matilda (2010)
The Girl from Snowy  River (The Matilda Series Book 2) (2012)
The Road to Gundagai (The Matilda Series Book 3) (2013)
To Love a Sunburnt Country (The Matilda Series Book 4) (2015)
The Ghost by the Billabong (The Matilda Series Book 5) (2015)
If Blood Should Stain the Wattle (The Matilda Series Book 6) (2017)
Facing the Flame (The Matilda Series Book 7) (2017)
The Last Dingo Summer (The Matilda Series Book 8) (2019)
Clancy of the Overflow (The Matilda Series Book 9) (2020)

Miscellaneous
 Missing You, Love Sara (2000)
 Dark Wind Blowing (2001)

Adult fiction
 A War for Gentlemen (2003)
 To Love a Sunburnt Country

Adult non-fiction
 Seasons of Content (1998)
 Earthly Delights (2001)
 The Secret Life of Santa Claus 
 Rocket Your Child into Reading (2004)
 I Spy a Great Reader 
 A Year in the Valley (2010)
 Let the Land Speak (2013)

Gardening and ecology books
 Organic Gardening in Australia (1986), published as 'Jacqueline French'
 Natural Rose Growing: An Organic Approach to Gardening (1988), published as 'Jacqueline French'
 The Organic Garden Doctor (1988), published as 'Jacqueline French'
 Natural Control of Household Pests (1990), published as 'Jacqueline French'
 The Wilderness Garden: A Radical New View of Australian Growing Methods (1993)
 The Chook Book (1993)
 The Salad Garden (1993)
 Organic Control of Household Pests (1993)
 Organic Control of Common Weeds (1993), revised edition published 1997
 The Earth Gardeners Companion: A Month-by-Month Guide (1993)
 The Chook Book (1993)
 A to Z of Useful Plants (1993)
 Book of Lavender (1994)
 Book of Mint (1994)
 Book of Rosemary (1994)
 Book of Thyme (1994)
 Book of Chilli (1994)
 Book of Garlic (1994)
 Book of Parsley (1994)
 Book of Basil (1994)
 Jackie French's Guide to Companion Planting in Australia and New Zealand (1994)
 Switch! A Book of Home-Made Power, Water, and Garbage Systems (1994)
 Household Self Sufficiency (1994)
 New Plants from Old (1994)
 Back Yard Self Sufficiency (1995)
 The Organic Garden Problem Solver (1995)
 Plants That Never Say Die (1995)
 Soil Food: 3,764 Ways to Feed Your Garden (1995)
 Jackie French's Top Ten Vegetables (1995)
 Jackie French's Cook Book (1995)
 The Pumpkin Book (1996)
 Yates Guide to Edible Gardening (1996)
 Growing Flowers Naturally (1996)
 Making Money from Your Garden (1997)
 Yates Guide to Herbs (1998)
 Jackie French's Household Herb Book (1998)
 The Household Herbal (1998)
 Natural Solutions (1999)
 The Best of Jackie French: A Practical Guide to Everything from Aphids to Zucchini Chocolate Cake (2000)
 The House That Jackie Built (2001)
 Earthly Delights (2001)
 New Plants from Old: Simple, Natural, No-Cost Plant Propagation (2007), second edition of A to Z of Useful Plants (1994)
 The Wilderness Garden: Beyond Organic Gardening (2007), second edition of The Wilderness Garden: A Radical New View of Australian Growing Methods (1993)
 The Earth Gardener's Companion (2009)
 Backyard Self Sufficiency (2009)

Adaptations
 Hitler's Daughter: The Play, based on Hitler's Daughter (1999) and adapted by Monkey Baa Theatre
 Pete the Sheep: The Musical, also adapted by Monkey Baa Theatre

References

 
Bibliographies by writer
Bibliographies of Australian writers
Children's literature bibliographies